Lauren Ashley Carter is an American actress and producer.

Personal life 
Carter grew up in Ohio and graduated from the University of Cincinnati – College-Conservatory of Music with a Bachelor of Fine Arts degree in Dramatic Performance in 2008.  She is a fan of horror and science fiction.  In a 2016 interview with SciFiNow, Carter said "If you say you don’t like horror, it just means that you haven’t found the right movie." In 2019, Carter explained that she became a horror fan because she watched horror films on VHS with her father.

Film Career 
Variety described her acting in Jug Face as "a fine performance", and The New York Times wrote of her acting in The Woman that it was "dexterously understated". In 2016 Carter wrote a piece for the Modern Horrors website in which she discussed a film role that she turned down due to concerns for her safety.

Theatre 
In 2014, Carter played Ruth in The Human Race Theatre Company's production of Miracle On South Division Street at the Loft Theatre in Dayton, Ohio.

Filmography

Film

Television

Web series

References

External links 
 
 

Living people
Actresses from Ohio
American film producers
American film actresses
Year of birth missing (living people)
University of Cincinnati – College-Conservatory of Music alumni
American women film producers
21st-century American women